San Tin Highway is a northeast-southwest expressway at San Tin in north-western New Territories of Hong Kong. San Tin Highway connects Fanling Highway at its northeastern end at San Tin Interchange to a fork at the Tsing Long Highway and Yuen Long Highway at Kam Tin River east of Yuen Long at the southwestern end of the San Tin Highway. San Tin Highway is also part of Route 9. The road was completed between 1991 and 1993.

Description
San Tin Highway connects the Tsing Long Highway and the Yuen Long Highway north of Au Tau, near the new town of Yuen Long. It is also part of Route 9. The road was completed between 1991 and 1993. The speed limit of the expressway is 100 km/h.

The intersection between San Tin Highway and Fanling Highway is the San Tin Interchange. Slip roads from San Tin Interchange on to San Sham Road lead 2 km north to Hong Kong's only 24-hour border crossing at the Lok Ma Chau Control Point–Huanggang Port border crossing with Shenzhen in mainland China. The slip roads were completed in January 2007. Before their construction, the vast amount of lorries and goods vehicles using the roundabout caused serious traffic congestion, on San Sham Road and occasionally on San Tin Highway.

Before the completion of Tsing Long Highway, the southern end of the Highway connected to Castle Peak Road and Au Tau Interchange. When Tsing Long Highway was opened in 1998, San Tin Highway was connected to it, thus linking up with Tai Lam Tunnel and Yuen Long Highway. The interchange near Fairview Park is the roundabout which has the most exits in Hong Kong. It has 7 entrances and exits which lead to:
 Fairview Park (Joining Fairview Park Boulevard)
 San Tin Highway (Bidirectional)
 Castle Peak Road — Tam Mi (Bidirectional)
 San Tam Road (Bidirectional)

Interchanges

References

External links
 

Expressways in Hong Kong
Route 9 (Hong Kong)
Yuen Long